The World Junior Hockey Championship is played every year from December 26 to January 5, and is a major event on the sporting calendar for many Canadians. Every year Team Canada plays their final Round Robin game on New Year's Eve. In years when the tournament is played in or near Canada, large crowds attend the game. It is also broadcast annually by TSN (English) and RDS (French), attracting large audiences. In years that Canada and the United States are grouped in the same pool, the United States is usually Canada's opponent. If the tournament doesn't schedule games on New Year's Eve, such as in 2002 and 2005, Team Canada will play on December 30 instead. (In 2018, Team Canada's last round-robin game was also December 30; that year, however, the marquee matchup against the United States was held the afternoon of December 29 on the outdoor surface of New Era Field.)

List of games

Notes

References

Canada men's national ice hockey team
World Junior Ice Hockey Championships